() is the titular protagonist of the manga Naruto, created by Masashi Kishimoto. As the series progresses, he is a young ninja from the fictional village of Konohagakure (Hidden Leaf Village). The villagers ridicule and ostracize Naruto on account of the Nine-Tailed Demon Fox—a malevolent creature that attacked Konohagakure—that was sealed away in Naruto's body. Despite this, he aspires to become his village's leader, the Hokage, in order to receive their approval. His carefree, optimistic, and boisterous personality enables him to befriend other Konohagakure ninja, as well as ninja from other villages. Naruto appears in the series' films and in other media related to the franchise, including video games and original video animations (OVA), as well as the sequel Boruto: Naruto Next Generations, where he is the Hokage, and his son, Boruto Uzumaki, is the protagonist.

When creating Naruto for the initial part of the series, Kishimoto kept the character "simple and stupid", while giving him many attributes of an ideal hero. Kishimoto gave Naruto a dark side by adding tragedy to the character's past. He has revised Naruto's image many times, providing the character with different clothes intended to appeal to Western audiences and to make him easier to illustrate. Kishimoto changed his design for Part II of the storyline, which starts two-and-a-half years after Part I. Naruto is voiced by Junko Takeuchi in the original animated series and Maile Flanagan in the English adaptations.

Merchandise based on Naruto includes figurines and keychains. Naruto's character development has been praised by anime and manga publications and has drawn scholarly attention. Although some initially saw him as a typical manga and anime protagonist comparable to those in other shōnen manga, others have praised his personality and character development as he avoids stereotypes typically seen in similar media. The character has also been the subject of researches in literature, making him stand out in fiction based on his traits and growth.

Creation and conception

Original concept and influences

During the 1990s, new manga author Masashi Kishimoto sought to write a one-shot chapter that would feature Naruto as a chef, but this version never made it to print. Kishimoto originally wanted to make Naruto a child who could transform into a fox, so he created a one-shot of Naruto for the summer 1997 issue of Akamaru Jump magazine based on the idea. When comparing both the Naruto one-shot and his other work, Karakuri, Kishimoto realized that former's title character was more appealing than the lead of Karakuri. Kishimoto reflects Naruto's "honest" smile was well received in contrast to the sly look the main character from Karakuri had. Following the success of another one-shot, Mario, Kishimoto started working on the Naruto series where he wanted to reuse the title character from his earlier one-shot. Kishimoto wrote the first two chapters to show his appeal to the readers and then focus on the other protagonists despite difficulties. Following the second chapter, Kishimoto introduced the other protagonists but as bad relationships including with Sasuke Uchiha and Naruto's constant reject crushes at Sakura Haruno. The manga story was planned to show Naruto's coming-of-age through multiple fights and looked forward to seeing the conclusion.

For the serialized version, Kishimoto incorporated traits he felt made an ideal hero in the creation of Naruto: a straightforward way of thinking, a mischievous side, and attributes possessed by Goku from the Dragon Ball franchise. Aiming to keep Naruto "simple and stupid", Although Goku was a major influence to Naruto, Kishimoto was more attracted by Dragon Ball character Krillin as he comes across as more human than the protagonist for displaying flaws that made the readers easier to accept in a similar fashion to his mentor Iruka Umino. Kishimoto avoided modeling him after anyone in particular, instead conceiving of him as naïve with a dark side resulting from his harsh past. Despite this, he is always optimistic, a trait Kishimoto said makes this character unique. By and large, Naruto's personality is childish; the creator tried to convey this trait in his illustrations. Kishimoto notes as an example of this the cover of volume 10, where Kishimoto depicts Naruto mimicking a turtle as a child might do. Naruto was Kishimoto's first published manga, and he focused on making Naruto's facial expressions consistent in difficult situations. He commented: "It's rather awkward to talk about what makes Naruto appealing to audiences, but I think his being a knucklehead gives him an appeal." He believed it was Naruto's losses that made readers identify with him, although he wanted Naruto not to feel defeat again, which was his primary aim when writing the series. Kishimoto has said that Naruto's burning desire to be a ninja was based on his own ambition to succeed as a manga artist. As the series went on, Kishimtoto wrote the older incarnations of Naruto to be naive idealists due to how Naruto was written to continuously avoid repeating previous mistakes. However, at the same Kishimoto wrote him as a sign of hope, something important in regard to the series' audience.

In the original Japanese versions of Naruto, Naruto often ends his sentences with the addendum "-ttebayo" (which achieves an effect similar to ending a sentence with "you know?" in English). Kishimoto wanted to give Naruto a childlike catchphrase, and "dattebayo" came to mind; he believed that the phrase complements Naruto's character, and served as a verbal tic that portrayed him in a brattish manner. Throughout the first episodes of the English dub version, "dattebayo" and "-ttebayo" were replaced with the phrase "Believe it!", both to mirror the effect, and to match the character's lip movements, although later in the English dub Naruto stopped saying "Believe it" and the phrase was replaced with "You Know?".

Development

After fans likened Naruto, Sasuke and Sakura to the three main characters from Harry Potter fantasy books, Kishimoto noted that both trios began their careers in a classroom, though he added that the similarity was unintentional. During the series' publication, Kishimoto married and had children. This influenced how he viewed Naruto's character. Naruto met his parents, and learned of their sacrifices in order to help him to control the Fox inside him so that he could protect their world. As a result, Naruto appreciated his life more and learned that his parents loved him, something the author wanted the character to feel based on his own experience as a father. In the first chapters of the series, Kishimoto did not conceive the idea that Naruto would be the son of Minato Namikaze. However, as time passed on, the manga author made touches to Minato's face shown in the Hokage Mountain in Konoha to make them more similar to Naruto with an emphasis on their spiky hairs. However, in order to reduce too many similarities, Kushina Uzumaki's character was made to look like Naruto's face.

Out of all the student-teacher relationships Kishimoto has created in the Naruto series, the one between Naruto and Jiraiya is his favorite. Right before Jiraiya's death in his fight against Pain in his last moments, he discovers the origin of Pain's multiple bodies and uses his last forces to send that message as a piece of advice to Naruto so that Naruto could defeat him in his place. This arc was the most difficult one to write; he felt this because Naruto truly forgave his enemy. Instead of having the protagonist kill the enemy he hates as happens in other series, Kishimoto found the idea of the two characters interacting and settling their differences more challenging. This had a major impact on the writer, and he decided to have Naruto forgive Sasuke during their final fight in a similar manner as he interacted with Nagato. Kishimoto felt the need to create a story arc that would emphasize the tragedy of wars, leading to the final arc which would include a war. The principal reason for this was a significant difference between the two main characters, Naruto who had no knowledge of wars, and Sasuke who was a victim of one; his entire clan had been annihilated to avoid a potential civil war. As a result, Kishimoto created Nagato as a war victim who would Jiraiya, and act as Naruto's nemesis so he would understand the tragedy that Sasuke had experienced. As a result, Naruto's coming-of-age would have been completed in this arc and the final arc where Naruto deals with world war and develops a vision of the shinobi world as well as how he should handle the conflict.

In 2013, when Naruto was reaching its climax, Kishimoto envisioned the idea of Naruto becoming a father. This resulted in the creation of Boruto Uzumaki, Naruto and Hinata's first child. Kishimoto wanted Boruto to act like his father, but at the same time, have differences between each other. Despite not wishing to reveal much about Boruto due to developments of Boruto: Naruto Next Generations, he added that Boruto is not as direct as Naruto. In the 2015 film Boruto: Naruto the Movie, Kishimoto developed Boruto and Naruto's relationship from his relationship with his sons. In portraying the adult Naruto, Kishimoto did not want to make the character to give a cool impression in contrast to his younger days as a war hero because Naruto being a strong father figure to Boruto would be too boring for the narrative. Instead, Kishimoto wanted the film to depict the father and son relationship between Boruto and Naruto. Similarly, Chengxi Huang wanted to properly display Naruto's facial expression during this scene as stating that while Naruto has grown up ever since his introduction, his gentle smile was the same. Manga author Mikio Ikemoto claimed the scene in which Naruto helps his son to create a large Rasengan was his favorite at the time of drawing Boruto as across this moment he had to draw Naruto's past to the point he "felt the weight of NARUTO series and its long history behind it."

Rivalry 
Early in the making of the series, Kishimoto had poor faith in the manga as he believes the series was lacking something to become popular. After being recommended by his editor to give the protagonist a rival, Kishimoto wrote Sasuke with influences from Takehiko Inoue's Slam Dunk manga which was famous for dealing with rivalries. When first introducing Sasuke, Kishimoto wrote him as a rival who never noticed Naruto. However, as the series continued, Naruto became strong enough to finally be recognized by Sasuke as a rival. He also intended for both of them to be brother-like due to the fact both characters suffered loneliness, something which made the readers relate to them as he noted through fan letters. By Part I's ending, the bond between Naruto and Sasuke was weakened as a result of their fight but still expected from the time when the Sasuke accepted Naruto as an equal. Kishimoto compared Sasuke and Naruto to the concept of yin and yang because of their notable differences. When one of the two progressed, Kishimoto made sure the other did too. During the climax of Part I, Naruto and Sasuke engage in a mortal fight which was directed by Atsushi Wakabayashi from Pierrot. In an interview, the director claimed that the animation was based on a journey to Lake Mashu from Hokkaido to come up with new ideas. Wakabayashi aimed for the characters to move stilted based on storyboards he made, leading to entertaining sequences. When Naruto becomes berserker due to the Nine-Tailed Demon Fox's influence, Norio Matsumoto aimed to make Naruto behave like a beast with Wakabayashi aiming to make Naruto look like an equal to his rival. The staff was inspired by the 1970s series like the boxing series Ashita no Joe, most notably its lead character, Joe Yabuki, who was often seen as an underdog the audience rooted for. However, the team still worked carefully to make the two ninjas be equals without overpowering each other.

Before the serialization began, Kishimoto had decided the ending would feature a fight between Naruto and Sasuke. He wanted the conflict to end with Naruto forgiving Sasuke as he had forgiven Nagato while also aiming it as their final battle in the manga. In regard to the fight, Kishimoto wanted to focus on hand-to-hand combat rather than ninja techniques. Anime staff Chengxi Huang said the animated adaptation of this fight, the group worked carefully to depict the action in every scene by showing changes on Sasuke and Naruto's clothes and hair. Huang added he felt fatigue by working so much into this fight due to reaching 70 successive cuts at a time.

The final fight between Sasuke and Naruto was considered one biggest challenges by the staff from Pierrot as it took an entire month to adapt it from the manga. Director Hiroyuki Yamashita elected himself in charge of the battle which left most of the anime members relieved due to his experience. For the scenario, Pierrot received assistance from the CyberConnect2 develop who had already adapted this battle through the fighting game Naruto Shippuden: Ultimate Ninja Storm 4. There was a need to make every movement in the fight to look realistic, giving Sasuke a scary look as well the hair movement in order to express the idea of both fighters willing to do anything to kill each other, which confused some due to Naruto's wish to avoid this fate. The final clash between Sasuke's Chidori and Naruto's Rasengan moves involved references from other scenes of the series to give the viewer a bigger emotional impact. The staff noted that following this fight, Sasuke's face became calmer despite his initial look, giving room to explore his redemption. A symbolism Kishimoto used in the series' finale following the final battle was Naruto returning Sasuke his original bandana representing how their bonds are tied again and no longer have a reason to kill each other.

Love interests 
Naruto's romantic partner was decided during the early stages of the manga. Since Hinata Hyuga always respected Naruto, even before the series' beginning, even before his academy mentor Iruka Umino, Kishimoto felt they were meant to be. This angered his wife who wanted Naruto to marry Sakura Haruno. When Sakura was introduced, Kishimoto did not think of her as Naruto's future wife, as he saw them as being just friends and teammates, although once Hinata had appeared, the author thought of forming a love triangle between the three characters. He later regretted the love triangle as he considered Naruto a fighting series with little focus on romance, and he reiterated that "it was all about Naruto and Hinata getting married from an early stage."

When seeing the staff's work to focus a film on Naruto's relationship with Hinata, The Last: Naruto the Movie, Kishimoto decided to oversee the project. Nevertheless, he enjoyed seeing Naruto and Hinata's romantical scenes he did not write. In regard to Naruto's rank which remains as the lowest one, Genin, due to Naruto spending most of his Part II's time fighting and training, Kishimoto decided Naruto would skip the following ranks to become the Hokage, which he felt was appealing. In the making of The Last: Naruto the Movie, Hinata makes a red scarf for Naruto. This was based on how Kishimoto's wife actually once did which brought laughs to the staff developing the film.

Screenwriter Maruo Kyozuka said that he wanted to depict a love triangle between Naruto, Hinata and Toneri Otsutsuki in the film. Although Naruto is initially clueless about Hinata's feelings for him, during the film he begins to acknowledge and respond to them. Hinata's character was also developed in the film, with Kyozuka saying that she had to put aside her feelings for Naruto to accept Toneri's proposal so she could find Hanabi. During this scene, Kyozuka wanted to depict Naruto at his lowest after his rejection by Hinata. He then returned Naruto to his brave self, with the character resolving to continue his mission regardless of the cost. Animator Chengxi Huang behind multiple Naruto series took a liking to this couple ever since he started working in Naruto Shippuden, often aiming to draw scenes of the two and most notably a scene from the final arc when Hinata slaps Naruto to calm him following the death of Neji Hyuga. In the making of the film, he thanked Kishimoto for accepting to do The Last where the couple was explored furthermore. He looked at their adult selves as an appealing married couple but had to remove a video he made that received backlash for being inappropriate for the demographic.

Design
Although a real ninja wears blue to be inconspicuous, Kishimoto gave Naruto an orange jumpsuit to fit the shōnen genre. His wardrobe is based on clothing that Kishimoto wore when he was younger. According to him, a pre-existing design would not have made Naruto unique, whereas something original would have made him too distinctive. Because Naruto is associated with spirals in terms of objects he uses, the designer incorporated swirl patterns into the costume. Initial illustrations depicted Naruto in boots, but Kishimoto replaced these with sandals, because he enjoys drawing toes. The goggles Naruto used to wear were replaced with a hitai-ite, or shinobi headband, because they were too time-consuming to draw. One of the most difficult design choices was the color palette of Naruto's outfit. The orange in his costume makes Naruto pop and the blue parts are complementary. Kishimoto apologized to the anime staff for Naruto's design, as he considered it too difficult to animate.

Kishimoto was satisfied with his character having blond hair and blue eyes, something rarely seen in Japanese anime or manga. This also appealed to an international readership, something the editor of the American magazine Shonen Jump has noted. Of all his series' characters, Kishimoto most identified with Naruto. When asked why Naruto's favorite food was ramen instead of kitsune udon, Kishimoto said that he himself likes eating ramen. In the Naruto: Clash of Ninja video game series, Naruto is playable in various stages of the Demon Fox's manifestation, characterized by a red chakra. Kishimoto took inspiration from the games' presentation of these forms, imitating one of them for the manga cover of volume 26.

When designing Naruto for his Part II appearance, Kishimoto changed his character's clothing to an orange and black top, orange pants, and black sandals. He also gave him a red cape with black flames at the bottom when fighting Pain, a member of the Akatsuki. He drew Naruto's forehead-protector wider to make his eyebrows easier to draw, something that had bothered him with his previous design. He also noted that Naruto's pants made the character look too childish. To remedy this, Kishimoto designed them to roll up, giving him a more mature appearance. He gave Naruto this look in order to make him stand out during action scenes.

For the events of the film The Last: Naruto the Movie (2014) as well as the final episodes of Naruto: Shippuden, Naruto was given a young adult appearance. His hair was made shorter, while his height was expanded notably in contrast to his Part II design. He was given two different outfits, a casual look consisting of an orange shirt as well as a design consisting of a black shirt with orange pants specifically meant for his missions. Due to his growth, Naruto wears a different headband, while his new ninja appearance was created with the purpose of being able to carry weapons more easily. Nevertheless, both looks keep the character's spiralling logo that was carried from his late mother's gone group, the Uzumaki clan.

Voice actors

Although a male voice actor was sought for the Japanese adaptation of the Naruto role, the actress Junko Takeuchi was chosen instead over many male applicants. Before recording the first episode, Takeuchi noticed several lines from the script that ended with exclamation marks, which helped her to define Naruto's voice. She noted difficulties in transitioning from the young Naruto to the older Naruto in the animated adaptation of Part II. She had to record the first episode of Part II when Naruto's character was older and more mature only one week after voicing the younger, immature character. Nine years after first voicing the character, while still finding it tough to voice Naruto, Takeuchi's opinion of him changed with her feeling he was "a very reliable young man." She admired his ability to prioritize and calmly make important decisions, and believes these traits will inspire viewers worldwide.

In regard to Naruto's growth Takeuchi was happy with the story and had hoped that Naruto would end up in a relationship with Hinata. Takeuchi was reminded of Naruto's late godfather, Jiraiya, when she read the script. She thought that although Naruto's declaration of love was the most important part of the character's growth, his true nature had not changed at that point. Satisfied with the story, Takeuchi thought that the audience would agree with her view. For the film Boruto: Naruto the Movie, Takeuchi was surprised with how Naruto has grown up ever since she first voiced him, not only in the idea of age or new job but also the fact that he has become a father. As a result, she befriended Yūko Sanpei, voice actress behind Boruto. Takeuchi felt the writing for the adult Naruto was different from his younger days as his mannerism had changed too, joking that she never saw such growth in the story when first voicing him. As a result, she mentions having had some inner complications with how she should show the character's growth.

The producers of the English version of the anime stated that Naruto was the most difficult character to cast, adding that Maile Flanagan "has Naruto down, from the mischievous side, that precocious 12-year-old we learn to love, to the serious side." Flanagan avoided listening to Junko Takeuchi's performance as she did not want to imitate it, stating she wanted to develop her own voice for the character. Her performance has been praised as showing Naruto's brashness and later growth in confidence. In a 2014 interview, Flanagan claimed she had never heard of Naruto before her audition. She looked the show up after being chosen and felt the release of the English dub would be popular. She is recognized more for her work voicing Naruto than from other roles she has done in her career, although some fans did not expect that Naruto would be voiced by a woman. Flanagan and Amanda C. Miller (Boruto) found the two family members similar in nature despite having different backgrounds. Flanagan was surprised by how her character changed across the years but felt he was still the same for her, finding challenging to voice Naruto again when coming back to voice the younger Naruto. In regard to the change of tone, Flanagan was surprised by the fact that the dubbers did not replace her despite Naruto's age but felt it was something common in Japanese series.

Synopsis
Introduced as a young orphan boy of 12 years with blond, spiky hair and blue eyes, Naruto Uzumaki graduates as a ninja from Konohagakure while bonding with his teacher Iruka Umino. Naruto seeks attention as he was ridiculed during his childhood. To be accepted and respected, he resolves to become Konohagakure's Hokage and surpass all previous leaders, no matter the difficulties. While becoming a ninja, Naruto forms friendships that he initially lacked, linking some of them to family relationships. Although Naruto sometimes finds himself unable to accomplish the tasks he proposes to do, other characters believe that he will be an excellent Hokage because of his positive impact on their lives. As an adult, Naruto claims that the Konohagakure village became his family due to his job of being the new Hokage, something he learned from the Third Hokage Hiruzen Sarutobi. As a result, he initially suffered a poor relationship with his son, Boruto, due to the little time he spends with his bloodline family.

Appearances

In Naruto

Part I

Naruto is an orphan who has a dangerous fox-like entity known as Kurama the Nine-Tailed Fox sealed within his body by his father, the Fourth Hokage Minato Namikaze, the leader of Konoha's ninja force, at the cost of his own life and that of his wife, Kushina Uzumaki. This possession led to Naruto being ridiculed frequently by the rest of Konoha; being associated with him was considered taboo. As a youth, Naruto makes jokes and plays pranks to attract attention. Desiring what he lacked in his early life, Naruto dreams of becoming a Hokage himself with the hope that it will bring him the villagers' recognition and respect. In an attempt to become a ninja, Naruto is horrified to learn of his Jinchuriki nature, but finds acceptance from his teacher Iruka Umino, whom he views as a father. After learning the powerful Multi-Shadow Clone Jutsu, an ability to create physical copies of the user, Naruto becomes a ninja. He joins a ninja group under the leadership of Kakashi Hatake where he made friends with Sasuke Uchiha and Sakura Haruno. These are his classmates who are also assigned to Team 7: Sasuke Uchiha, with whom he has had a rivalry since they first met at the ninja academy, and Sakura Haruno who he has a crush on which is not reciprocated by her as she is infatuated with Sasuke.

While being examined to increase his ninja rank, Naruto meets the legendary ninja Jiraiya and learns how to summon toads to aid him in battle, and to control part of the Nine Tails's chakra energy. The exams are interrupted by the invasion of Konohagakure by the criminal Orochimaru and the ninja of Sunagakure. Naruto defeats the sand village's One Tail Jinchuriki Gaara and convinces him there is a better way to live. Shortly afterward, Naruto discovers the Akatsuki, a criminal organization that seeks to extract the Nine-Tails from his body. Though Jiraiya drives them off during this first meeting, learning its member Itachi is both Sasuke's brother, and the man who killed their family, the Akatsuki still plan to kidnap Naruto. When Sasuke leaves the village to join Orochimaru's forces to obtain the power to kill Itachi, Naruto on his insistence and promise to Sakura becomes part of a rescue team to retrieve him. Naruto and Sasuke ultimately have a one-on-one battle, and after a close battle, Sasuke comes out as the victor. He, however can not bring himself to kill Naruto and instead leaves. The two go their separate ways, but Naruto does not give up on Sasuke, leaving with Jiraiya for two and half years to prepare himself for his next encounter with Sasuke and the Akatsuki.

Part II
After his two and a half years of training, Naruto returns to Konoha (the Leaf Village) and begins to deal more actively with the Akatsuki threat by saving Gaara from their clutches. To fight them, Naruto trains with Kakashi to infuse the Rasengan with his own wind-element chakra, creating the  attack that proves instrumental in the downfall of the Akatsuki member Kakuzu. Despite being targeted by the Akatsuki, Naruto dedicates himself to finding and retrieving Sasuke, who eventually disposes of Orochimaru and starts acting on his vengeance-driven whims. Over time, though resisting the urge to use the creature's power, the Nine Tails's influence over him expands to the point where he begins to lose his rationality as more chakra manifests in the form of tails to the point the Tailed Beast can take control of his body. This ultimately causes him to go on a rampage, destroying everything in his path.

After learning that Jiraiya has been killed by the Akatsuki leader, Pain, Naruto prepares for a future encounter by learning toad-style , a power-enhancing ability involving the gathering of natural energy through stillness, while also perfecting Naruto's Rasenshuriken in the process. When they face off, Naruto is pinned to the ground with iron rods and loses control of the Fox's chakra when his Hinata Hyuga nearly dies protecting him. At that time, Naruto meets his father Minato Namikaze within his subconcious and learns about his status as the Fourth Hokage and him being the one who sealed the Fox so that Naruto could use it to defeat the Akatsuki founder Tobi who was behind the Fox's attack on Konohagakure. With Minato stopping the Fox, Naruto regains control of his body, and defeats Pain. Learning that both are Jiraiya's students, Naruto convinces him to quit Akatsuki, seeking to take Jiraiya's path to create a better ninja world.

When Naruto discovers Sasuke's plan to attack the Leaf Village, he decides to confront him in a battle which could end both their lives should Naruto be unable to save him. He prepares himself for the upcoming fight by becoming a student under the vessel of the Eight-Tails, Killer B, to take full control of Kurama's powers. He succeeds with help from his late mother, Kushina Uzumaki, who placed a chakra imprint of herself within the seal so when the time comes, she could have a chance to see her son again. When Naruto learns that all his comrades are battling Tobi's army to protect him, he takes Killer B to join him in the battle, eventually cooperating with Kurama. As he fights, Naruto meets Hagoromo Ōtsutsuki, the Sage of the Six Paths, who grants him enhanced Senjutsu known as the Six Paths Senjutsu. After he and Sasuke join forces to face both Tobi and Madara who are using the Ten-Tails, they have to seal a bigger threat named Kaguya Ōtsutsuki, who is in her Ten-Tails form. After defeating and sealing Kaguya with the cooperation of the rest of Team 7, Naruto ends up having to fight Sasuke due to their conflicting views regarding the ninja world's future. As both end up losing an arm, Naruto and Sasuke reconcile. He receives a new arm created from the First Hokage's cells later. Years later, Naruto is married to Hinata with whom he has had two children – Boruto and Himawari Uzumaki.

In the Boruto series
In the spin-off manga Naruto: The Seventh Hokage and the Scarlet Spring, Naruto and his allies go to defeat a new Akatsuki organization as Sasuke fears Kaguya's allies might try to attack them. In Boruto: Naruto the Movie (2015), which takes place after the series' epilogue, Naruto's Hokage status strains his relationship with his son Boruto as his duties often kept him from his family. During the ninja examinations, Naruto is abducted by Kaguya's descendants, Momoshiki and Kinshiki, and then saved by his son Boruto, Sasuke, and the Kage, before helping his son to destroy Momoshiki. Across this fight, Naruto and Boruto reconcile. In Boruto: Naruto Next Generations, the manga starts in a distant future where Naruto is implied to be dead or missing in action by an enemy of Boruto, Kawaki. In the anime before Boruto became a ninja, Naruto often made appearances with his new family. In the manga, a younger Kawaki is adopted by Naruto when the teenager becomes a fugitive from the group Kara. Naruto clashes with the members from Kara to protect his children, to which the village fears the Ōtsutsuki clan planning to attack again through Kara's members as well like Boruto and Kawaki who share a cursed mark known as Karma. In the fight against Kara's leader Isshiki Ōtsutsuki, Naruto and Kurama combine their chakra together at the cost of their possible death. In the aftermath, Kurama reveals he was told a lie about this combination and he is the only one to die. As Kurama goes to the afterlife, Naruto continues to fight against the remaining Kara members.

In light novels
Naruto also appears in the epilogue light novels of the series. In the first one, despite still not having obtained his prosthetic arm, goes on a mission with his friend Sai to capture a dangerous ninja named Garyō. In the second one, he allies with Sunagakure ninja Temari's team to find the missing Shikamaru Nara who made a promise to him to work together once Naruto became the Hokage. He makes a brief appearance in Sakura Hiden where he and Hinata try to aid Sakura from a group of enemies. In Sasuke Hiden, he sends a message to Sasuke, which convinces him to return to Konohagakure. In the final one, Konoha Hiden, Naruto marries Hinata after asking his former mentor, Iruka Umino, to the place of his father for the wedding. A novel by Mirei Miyamoto focuses on Naruto's life as a father. Another novel, Naruto Retsuden, explores Naruto having falling to an illness as a result of relying on Kurama's chakra across his entire life.

In other media

As the series' title character, Naruto appears in every movie in the series. He typically appears as the lead character on a mission with comrades from Konohagakure. Naruto: Shippūden the Movie marks the first appearance of Naruto in his Part II form. In Road to Ninja: Naruto the Movie, an alternate version of the character named Menma appears as the main antagonist of the film.

In The Last: Naruto the Movie, which takes place after the events of the series, Naruto faces Toneri Otsutsuki; at the movie's climax, Naruto and Hinata enter a relationship that eventually leads to their marriage. Kishimoto, the film's chief story supervisor, admitted that he was embarrassed writing romance scenes in the series. However, upon watching Naruto and Hinata share their first kiss, he felt a mixture of satisfaction and sadness due to the two characters' growth since Narutos beginning; they had become like his own children.

Naruto also appears in all four OVAs produced for the series: helping his friend Konohamaru Sarutobi find a four-leaf clover in the first, escorting a ninja to his village and fighting the criminal who stole the village's "Hero's Water" in the second, participating in a tournament in the third, and working with Team 7 in the fourth. He appears as a supporting character in the spin-off manga titled Rock Lee and his Ninja Pals where his fellow Konohagakure ninja Rock Lee is the main character.

Naruto is a playable character in the Naruto video games. In several titles, it is possible to access a special version of him enhanced with the power from the Nine-Tailed Fox. In several games from the Ultimate Ninja series he is playable with his own versions of Rock Lee and Might Guy's techniques while wearing their costumes. Naruto Shippūden: Gekitou Ninja Taisen EX marks the first appearance of Naruto in his Part II form in a video game. For the series' 10th anniversary, Masashi Kishimoto drew an illustration of Naruto as Hokage. This portrayal of Naruto later appears as a secret character in the game Naruto Shippuden: Ultimate Ninja Storm 2. Naruto also appears in the iOS and Android mobile game Naruto Shippuden: Ultimate Ninja Blazing. He appears in several crossover video games that feature Naruto fighting against characters from other manga; these games include: Battle Stadium D.O.N, Jump Super Stars, and Jump Ultimate Stars. A Naruto avatar made a guest appearance in the MMORPG Second Life for a Jump Festa promotion titled Jumpland@Second Life. In Dragon Ball Z: Battle of Z Naruto's costume appears as an alternate costume for Goku. Outside Naruto, the character also appeared in the first popularity poll from the manga My Hero Academia by Kōhei Horikoshi. When the Naruto manga ended, Eiichiro Oda drew a cover of a One Piece manga chapter where Naruto is seen eating with the One Piece characters. Naruto was added to Fortnite Battle Royale in November 2021.

Naruto also makes an appearance in Live Spectacle Naruto (2015) and Live Spectacle Naruto: Song of the Akatsuki (2017), two stage plays based on the manga. Naruto is played by Koudai Matsouka.

Reception

Characterization and themes 

Naruto's character has received mostly positive critical response in printed and online publications. Praise was given by Joseph Szadkowski of The Washington Times who noted that Naruto "has become a pop-culture sensation." Naruto's character was analyzed by GameSpot's Joe Dodson who noted that despite having an "ideal" life, he still suffered from severe isolation, although he was praised for his optimistic personality by Carl Kimlinger of Anime News Network (ANN). Writers for Mania Entertainment labeled him a "good lead character" with good overall development despite certain problems at the beginning. Christina Carpenter of T.H.E.M. Anime Reviews disagreed with other writers, noting that while Naruto is a "likable enough scamp", his type of character has been done before in many anime and manga series. Yukari Fujimoto, a professor at Meiji University, sees Naruto himself as the manga's weakness. Manga author Nobuhiro Watsuki compared Naruto with Himura Kenshin and Monkey D. Luffy due to how they follow the ideals of not killing their oppponents. 

Writing for Popular Culture in Counseling, Psychotherapy, and Play-Based Interventions, Lawrence Rubin states that while Naruto has an optimistic and hyperactive personality, the Nine-Tailed Demon Fox (Kurama) within his body symbolizes his negative emotions. He comments that Naruto has a malevolent attitude when dealing with intense conflicts and emotions. He also states that Naruto would use Kurama's chakra for battles he can not handle with his own chakra. Rubin further notes that the more Naruto uses Kurama's chakra, the more he puts his comrades and himself in danger. Rubin feels the reason Naruto is a troublemaker is because some villagers avoid him and others mistreat him. He states that children growing up in the real world who have development issues can relate to his character. Rubin states that the search for acceptance, and being acknowledged by his peers is what motivates Naruto to keep going until he reaches his life's goal, becoming the Hokage. Rubin feels that Naruto's fights with enemies who try to bring harm to the Leaf Village further motivate him to become a powerful shinobi, and a "complete and mature person." Rubin concludes that Naruto's character development is similar to that of a modern American hero, the type who accidentally becomes better during a series and is able to build or restore peace.

Christopher A. Born, writing for DOAJ journal ASIANetwork Exchange, regards Naruto as a complex post-modern hero, showing "great heart." From Naruto's beginning, Born comments that the character is a nuisance, suggesting Naruto is the very definition of the word, given how he is characterized in the series, including how he interacts, and his behavior. Born argues that Naruto as a whole shows Confucian values, and that Naruto himself unsettles harmony in society. Amy Plumb, a PhD candidate at Macquarie University, states that Kishimoto used the mythology of the kitsune for Naruto's development throughout the series. She notes that at the beginning of the series, Naruto was a prankster and always causing trouble, the same as the kitsune. Plumb describes the Kyuubi (Demon) seal on Naruto's stomach as a catalyst for how he develops. Writing for Manga's Cultural Crossroads, Omote Tomoyuki compliments Naruto's character, saying that he has great ambition to achieve a tragic destiny. He comments how the character has matured over the course of the series, stating how after he became a shinobi, he had let go of his childish ways that happened in the beginning of the series, and how he rarely joked around in Part II of the series when he became a teenager. Franziska Ehmcke, professor of Japanese studies at Cologne University, theorized that Naruto was named after whirlpools of the sea landscape of the Awa no Naruto, and compared his behavior to that natural feature, as both figures have uncontrollable energy within them.  Mike Hale compared Naruto to Buffy Summers of Buffy the Vampire Slayer, praising the series' portrayal of childhood loneliness.  Rik Spanjers regards Naruto's childishness as one of his strengths because it gives him a well of resoluteness from which to draw on in his goal to end the ninja wars. A study which looked at if readers could predict character types based on physical cues regarded Naruto as an ENFP (Myers-Briggs) character type, impulsive and spontaneous, finding a foil in the ISTJ-type Sasuke.

Analysing Naruto's coming-of-age story, The Lawrentian found that Naruto's development embodies the idea of Bildungsroman, the idea of how importance is Naruto's growth across the narrative needed to move on the arc. Due to lacking parenting as a result of his parents' age during his birth, Naruto's personality starts fragile. Unaware of them, Naruto seeks to accomplish his mother's wish of becoming a hero and leader of the village, the Hokage. While initially portrayed as a weak character, Naruto finds strength in his mentors Kakashi and Jiraiya, another element common element in Bildungsroman as well as his connections with Sakura and Sasuke. As a result of losing Jiraiya, Naruto seeks to accomplish his mentor's wish of ending wars and the cycling of hatred, making Kishimoto capable of embodying the character more with the reader while maturing in the process. As a result, The Lawrentian finds that Naruto's character fills the concept of Bildungsroman, something other fictional characters fail to accomplish. 

Tejal Suhas Bagwe from Dissertation Submitted in Partial Fulfillment for the Degree of Masters of Arts in English describes Jiraya's death as the "loss of innocence" the Naruto goes through paralleling his life with Gaara, Sasuke or Madara. However, unlike these three characters who seek revenge and chaos for their losses, Naruto instead chooses another path derivative from these types of narrative, becoming more unique. Another aspect noted by the writer in regard to Naruto's character is how he becomes Kurama's companion despite the creature bearing hatred towards mankind for being used, resulting into multiple references to Japanese mythology based on its name and the new skills Naruto acquires when befriending the fox. Similarly, Anime News Network stated that thanks to Naruto's newfound pacifism when dealing with his quest of revenge and the rejection to violence, the story managed to become a "masterpiece".

Relationships 
His relationships with the other characters was described as appealing by IGN's Charles White and Jason Van Horn, most notably through his rivalry with Sasuke, as it shows "signs of maturity" in Naruto. However, his wish to retrieve Sasuke after the end of Part I was criticised because of his subsequent suffering. In a poll by Japanese pollster Charapedia, Naruto and Sasuke's rivalry reached the top place. Jacob Hope Chapman of ANN listed Naruto and Sasuke as one of "Anime's Fiercest Frenemies" considering their similarities and how they become friends after a mortal battle. His romantic involvement with other characters led to disputes as there were fans in favour of his relationship with Sakura Haruno, while others preferred Hinata Hyuga. His romance with Hinata in the film The Last earned multiple positive reactions from the media. Some critics wished The Last could be condensed so that their relationship was the focus of the movie. On a similar note, both McNulty and Andy Hanley from UK Anime Network enjoyed Naruto's relationship with his son Boruto due to the differences in their childhoods and how that becomes the focus of the film Boruto. His role in Boruto: Naruto Next Generations was praised for his more mature personality as well as his relationship with the young Kawaki. Leroy Douresseaux expected Kawaki will have a major impact in Boruto's life in regard to his way of fighting.

Combat 
Kimlinger of Anime News Network said that while Naruto's initial fight scenes are lacking conviction when compared to others, his encounter with Gaara is one of his best moments because its tactics surpassed most shōnen stereotypes. ANN's Theron Martin and Mania Entertainment's Justin Rich made similar comments. The character's final fight against Sasuke at the end of Part I attracted similar responses, due to the fighting styles employed, and the character development resulting from their rivalry. The enormous physical changes caused by the Nine-Tailed Demon Fox have also been the focus of critics, as Naruto's loss of control causes him to become a bigger threat to his loved ones than other series' antagonists. Carlo Santos of ANN commented on the character's growth in Part II, specifically his fight against Pain in which Naruto's comments on peace, and the means by which it is achieved, touch on philosophical themes never seen in a shōnen series. Chris Beveridge of Mania Entertainment noted a change in Naruto's attitude as he acts calmly and more seriously than in previous story arcs. Naruto's new Senjutsu style was praised, as was his careful preparation for the fight against Pain, which resulted in a detailed display of his skills. In regard to Naruto's fight against Sasuke, writers once again found depth in the handling of the rivals while also bringing a satisfying ending to the series. Amy McNulty of ANN also praised their final fight, expressing amazement at how brutal some scenes were since Naruto had become more of a pacifist than previous story arcs.

Popularity

In every official Weekly Shōnen Jump popularity poll of the series, Naruto ranks in the top five characters and, as of the beginning of 2012, has been in first place twice. In 2006, Naruto lost his top-two status to the characters Deidara, Kakashi and Sasuke in the magazine's sixth poll. In the 2011 poll, Naruto was once again in first place. In 2014, IGN listed him as the second best Naruto character when the series ended. In a Japanese TV special from August 2017, Naruto was voted as the 13th "strongest hero" from the Heisei Era. Additionally, in 2017 Charapedia poll, Naruto ranked 9th most ideal Prime Minister in anime series. In a 2018 poll from Shonen Jump, Naruto was also voted as the 10th most powerful character in the magazine's history. In poll from 2021, Naruto was voted as the second best character from Boruto: Naruto Next Generations behind his son. In the Crunchyroll Awards from 2022, Naruto was nominated for "Best Fight" against Isshiki in Boruto: Naruto Next Generations.

Merchandise has been modeled after Naruto, including keychains, and action figures. In the 2009 Society for the Promotion of Japanese Animation Awards, Junko Takeuchi won Best Voice Actress (Japanese) for her work as Naruto. Naruto was placed sixth in IGN's Top 25 Anime Characters of All Time with writer Chris Mackenzie stating that although: "Naruto actually isn't the most popular character in his own series most of the time," he is "the engine that powers the franchise." In the 2011 Guinness World Records Gamer's Edition, he was noted as the twenty-ninth best character appearing in video games.

While working for CyberConnect2 in the making of the .hack games, character designer Yoshiyuki Sadamoto used Naruto as a model for .hacks protagonist, Kite. Shortly afterwards, CyberConnect2 started developing the Naruto: Ultimate Ninja games although Sadamoto recalls he was unaware of this fact. Another character inspired by Naruto is Yuji Itadori from Jujutsu Kaisen; its author, Gege Akutami, enjoyed the story of how Naruto deals with a demon-like creature inside his body and decided to give Itadori a similar aura when eating the remains of the demon Ryomen Sukuna whom he carries a poor relationship. CyberConnect2 CEO Hiroshi Matsuyama also participated in the 2012 Paris Marathon while cosplaying as Naruto to celebrating the release of a new video game. Matsuyama also said that Naruto's Rasenshuriken was his favorite technique in the entire series due to its sounds as well as how the character executes it. Upon seeing the final fight between Naruto and Sasuke in Storm 4, Matsuyama felt emotional over seeing the final fight between Naruto and Sasuke. Matsuyama also made his own sketch of two fighters, aiming to put them the video game, promising gamers they would enjoy the emotions delivered by the fight. Matsuyama further reflected the anime's 133rd episode to be one of his favorites not only for the action sequences between Naruto and Sasuke but also the emotional value displayed.
In a poll from Anime! Anime!, Naruto and Sasuke as one of the best rivals turned into allies.

Cultural impact
Olympic medalist Usain Bolt expressed his love for Naruto and the Naruto series several times through Instagram posts. The Shanghai New World mall made an announcement in the beginning of 2019 that it plans on opening an indoor theme park on its 11th floor which will be called "Naruto World". The theme park will be 7,000 square meters in size and will be based on the Naruto manga. An officially authorized Ichiraku Ramen ramen noodle shop, based on Ichiraku Ramen from the anime, opened up in Shanghai's Global Harbor shopping mall in 2019. In June 2019, a life-size statue designed by Testuya Nishio was developed for display at the Wonder Festival 2019 Shanghai event. For the 2020 Summer Olympics, Naruto's image is being used as a character to represent the event. 

Naruto has had an influence on hip-hop music. Many rappers, both underground and mainstream have sprinkled Naruto references throughout their songs. Rapper Ski Mask the Slump God starts off the first verse of his song Catch me Outside with a reference to Naruto and his ninetails mode. Some artists go so far as revolving the theme of their entire album around Naruto, such as Dave's album Six Paths. in Dave's song Wanna Know (Remix) the track art is a direct reference to Naruto. It features the title in the Naruto font and color scheme. Singer Diana Garnet expressed her pleasure at recording one of the ending theme songs for the animated series of Naruto Shippuden stating that not only she has been a fan of the series ever since she was younger, but was also motivated by Naruto's character because of his determination not to give up no matter what challenge he faced. Similarly, in an analysis involving stereotypes of African Americans created by the British newspaper The Guardian, Naruto's character is viewed as relatable character due to prejudicial treatment the character receives early in the series. As a result, Naruto's life achievements he makes across the narrative, ending to his portrayal as the Seventh Hokage are seen as inspiring by the audience.

Allega Frank from Polygon noted that during the start of both the manga and anime Boruto: Naruto Next Generations, multiple fans were worried in regard to a flashforward; in this sequence an older Boruto is facing an enemy named Kawaki who implies Naruto might be dead so his fate left them worried.

References

External links

 

Anime and manga characters with accelerated healing
Child characters in anime and manga
Comics characters introduced in 1999
Fictional amputees
Fictional avatars
Fictional characters who can duplicate themselves
Fictional characters with air or wind abilities
Fictional ninja 
Male characters in anime and manga
Naruto characters
Orphan characters in anime and manga
Shapeshifter characters in comics
Teenage characters in anime and manga
Fictional child soldiers